Uncle Albert’s Adventures is a French series of adventure puzzle video games designed by Éric Viennot, developed by Lexis Numérique and published by Emme Interactive between 1998 and 2004. The first three games have been published in English.

Plot and gameplay 

Uncle Albert is known to be an adventurous inventor and traveller, keeping an album of all his discoveries, treasures, and secrets. The album is a travel log and journal full of sketches, living animals, and working mechanisms. The player interacts with the album, using bookmarks to navigate between the pages, and unlocking new pages by solving puzzles.

Games 

 1998: Uncle Albert’s Magical Album
 1999: Uncle Albert’s Fabulous Voyage
 2000: Uncle Albert’s Mysterious Island
 2003:  (not published in English)
 2004:  (not published in English)

Spin-off series 

 2002:  (not published in English)
 2003:  (not published in English)
 2004:  (not published in English)
 2006:  (not published in English)

Book 

 2000:  (not published in English, published in France by Éditions Albin Michel)

Reception
The first three Uncle Albert games were commercially successful. French newspaper Libération reported their combined sales at 500,000 units by October 2002.

References

External links 
  Uncle Albert’s Adventures on Éric Viennot’s website
  Former official website on the Internet Archive

Video game franchises introduced in 1998
Adventure games
Puzzle video games
Classic Mac OS games
Windows games
Video games developed in France
Lexis Numérique games